Josée Dayan (born 6 October 1943 in Toulouse, France) is a French film director, screenwriter and producer.

Life 

Dayan grew up in Algiers, Algeria, where her father Albert Dagnant, who came from a Jewish family, worked as a television director; her grandmother was the owner of a cinema. Since 1974 she directed mainly movies for television. In 1979, under her direction, a documentary about Simone de Beauvoir appeared. Her most successful works are the 1998 TV mini-series The Count of Monte Cristo with Gérard Depardieu in the lead role, and the 2002 mini-series Les Misérables with Depardieu and John Malkovich. Then there is Balzac: A Passionate Life (1999) and Cet amour-là (2001), both with Jeanne Moreau,  and Raspoutine (2011) with Depardieu. A major success was Les Liaisons dangereuses (2003) with Catherine Deneuve and Nastassja Kinski in the leading roles.

Filmography

External links 
 
 http://www.citwf.com/person489014.htm
 http://php88.free.fr/bdff/real.php?id=136&real=Jos%E9e%20Dayan

References 

1943 births
Living people
French women film directors
French television directors
People from Algiers
20th-century French Jews
Women television directors